The second and most recent series of British reality television show Pop Idol aired on ITV on from 13 September to 20 December 2003. Michelle McManus was announced as the winner and received a £1 million recording contract to release her debut album. Ant & Dec returned to present the show on ITV, whilst Simon Cowell, Neil Fox, Nicki Chapman and Pete Waterman all returned as judges.

The second series was not as successful as the first series, and the viewing figures for the finale were much lower. Waterman considered McManus an unworthy winner. In 2004, Pop Idol was axed and ITV announced a new show created by Cowell, with no involvement from Pop Idol creator Simon Fuller—The X Factor. The perceived similarity between the two shows later became the subject of a legal dispute.

Live shows
The live shows began on 25 October, and continued through to the live final on 20 December.

Finalists

* as of the start of the series

Heats and live shows

Results summary
Colour key

 In week 1 of the finals, Chris and Marc received the same vote percentage as did Roxanne and Brian. In week 2, Mark and Chris received the same vote percentage.

Live show details

Heat 1 (13 September- Recorded on 10 September 2003)

Notes;
The hosts revealed the contestants who received the top five numbers of votes in reverse order. Michelle McManus and Chris Hide advanced to the top 12 of the competition. The other eight contestants were eliminated.
Jason Brock and Rebecca Hayes returned for a second chance at the top 12 in the Wildcard Round.

Heat 2 (20 September-Recorded on 17 September 2003)

Notes
The hosts revealed the contestants who received the top five numbers of votes in reverse order. Kirsty Crawford and Brian Ormond advanced to the top 12 of the competition. The other 8 contestants were eliminated.
Jodie Connor and Susanne Manning returned for a second chance at the top 12 in the Wildcard Round.

Heat 3 (27 September- Recorded on 24 September 2003)

Notes
The hosts revealed the contestants who received the top five numbers of votes in reverse order. Marc Dillon and Roxanne Cooper advanced to the top 12 of the competition. The other 8 contestants were eliminated.
Kieran McDonald and Sam Nixon returned for a second chance at the top 12 in the Wildcard Round.

Heat 4 (4 October- Recorded on 1 October 2003)

Notes
The hosts revealed the contestants who received the top five numbers of votes in reverse order. Leon McPherson and Kim Gee advanced to the top 12 of the competition. The other 8 contestants were eliminated.
None of the contestants from this round made it into the Wildcard Round, making it the only group to not be represented at that stage.

Heat 5 (11 October- Recorded on 8 October 2003)

Notes
 The hosts revealed the contestants who received the top five numbers of votes in reverse order. Andy Scott-Lee and Mark Rhodes advanced to the top 12 of the competition. The other 8 contestants were eliminated.
 Glen Harvey and Danielle Tedford returned for a second chance at the top 12 in the Wildcard Round.
 Craig Chalmers later went on to make the live finals of Any Dream Will Do in 2007.

Wildcard round (18 October)

For the first time (and only time) on the UK version of Pop Idol, there was a Wildcard Round where previously eliminated contestants returned for a second chance at making it through to the live finals. As a result, the final 10 was to become a final twelve. The judges announced which eight contestants would earn a Wildcard place at the end of the 11 October results show, and that after they perform the public would choose one contestant to go through, and the judges would pick another. The eight contestants who contested the Wildcard Round were Jason Brock, Jodie Connor, Glen Harvey, Rebecca Hayes, Susanne Manning, Kieran McDonald, Sam Nixon and Danielle Tedford.

Notes
The judges selected Sam to move on into the Top 12 of the competition, before the hosts revealed the Top 3 vote getters. Susanne received the most votes, and completed the top 12. It was not made clear whether or not Sam was actually in the top 3, as the hosts stated that it was the top 3 of the remaining 7 contestants. Danielle missed out on the finals by one place for the second time.
In 2010, Jodie Connor's vocals were featured on the UK number-one single "Good Times" by London grime collective, Roll Deep, and she later went onto launch a solo career.

Live show 1 (25 October)

Theme: Songs by contestant's 'Pop Idol'

Due to the addition of two extra contestants through the Wildcard Round, it was announced that for the first two weeks of the finals, two contestants would be eliminated instead of the standard one.

Judges Prediction of who will leave 
Neil Fox: Leon McPherson and Mark Rhodes
Nicky Chapman: Leon McPherson  and Michelle McManus 
Pete Waterman: Leon McPherson and Kirsty Crawford
Simon Cowell: Leon McPherson and Kirsty Crawford

Notes
 Just 80 votes separated Chris Hide and Marc Dillon in week one.

Live show 2 (1 November)

Theme: Songs from contestant's birth year

Judges Prediction of who will leave 

Neil Fox: Mark Rhodes & Brian Ormond

Nicky Chapman: Marc Dillon & Brian Ormond

Pete Waterman: Brian Ormond & Kim Gee

Simon Cowell: Mark Rhodes & Brian Ormond

Live show 3 (8 November)

Theme: Elton John songs

Judges Prediction of who will leave 

Neil Fox: Chris Hide

Nicky Chapman: Chris Hide

Pete Waterman: Kim Gee

Simon Cowell: Kim Gee

Live show 4 (15 November)

Theme: Disco songs

Judges Prediction of who will leave 

Neil Fox: Chris Hide

Nicky Chapman: Chris Hide

Pete Waterman: Roxanne Cooper

Simon Cowell: Roxanne Cooper

Notes 

 Just 697 votes separated Mark Rhodes and Chris Hide in week four.
 Although Hide was second from bottom, he was announced as safe, leading viewers to assume that Suzanne had come second from bottom.

Live show 5 (22 November)

Theme: The Beatles songs

Judges Prediction of who will leave 

Neil Fox: Mark Rhodes 

Nicky Chapman: Mark Rhodes 

Pete Waterman: Mark Rhodes

Simon Cowell: Mark Rhodes

Live show 6 (29 November)

Theme: Big band

Judges Prediction of who will leave 

Neil Fox: Susanne Manning 

Nicky Chapman: Susanne Manning 

Pete Waterman: Susanne Manning 

Simon Cowell:  Susanne Manning

Live show 7 (6 December)

Theme: Christmas songs

Judges Prediction of who will leave 

Neil Fox: Mark Rhodes

Nicky Chapman: Mark Rhodes

Pete Waterman: Mark Rhodes

Simon Cowell: Mark Rhodes

Live show 8 (13 December)

Theme: Judges' song choice

Judges Prediction of who will leave 

Neil Fox: Mark Rhodes

Nicky Chapman: Mark Rhodes

Pete Waterman: Michelle McManus 

Simon Cowell: Refused to vote

Final (20 December)

Reception

Ratings

References

Series 02
2003 British television seasons
2003 in British music
2003 in British television